Isaac Cole Powell (born December 30, 1994) is an American actor and singer. He played the role of Daniel in the Broadway revival of the musical Once on This Island and was cast as Tony in the 2020 Broadway revival of West Side Story.

Early life and career
Powell was raised in Greensboro, North Carolina, the youngest of three children born to Terry and Will Powell, a three-time world CrossFit champion. His father is Mixed Native American and African-American; his mother is Caucasian. His sister, Jessica Powell, is a Certified Personal Trainer at their father's fitness studio is featured on TLC's My Big Fat Fabulous Life as Whitney's fitness trainer. Powell began to act in middle school with the Community Theatre of Greensboro. He attended Philip J. Weaver Academy, a performing arts high school, before transferring to a boarding program at the University of North Carolina School of the Arts (UNCSA) during his senior year of high school. He graduated from UNCSA with an acting degree in May 2017.

While in college, Powell began to accumulate professional acting credits, playing Nikos in the musical Legally Blonde at the Barn Dinner Theatre. After graduation, in the summer of 2017, he appeared in Newsies and Mamma Mia! with the Pittsburgh Civic Light Opera and originated the title role in Nikola Tesla Drops the Beat at the Adirondack Theatre Festival in Glens Falls, New York.

Powell played the role of Daniel in the 2017 Broadway revival of Once on This Island, which began previews in November 2017 and opened officially in December. Jesse Green, writing in The New York Times called Powell's solo, "Some Girls," a "quietly sensitive rendering." Robert Hofler, in TheWrap, wrote that Powell makes the song "the most poignant moment in this revival." TheaterMania's review deemed Powell, "charismatic and silvery-voiced." He recorded his role on the revival's cast album.

Powell competed in May 2018 on the live Broadway game show, I Only Have Lies for You. In the spring of 2018, he signed on with the New Pandemics modeling agency and modeled for Palomo Spain's and NIHL's fall 2019 lines at New York Fashion Week. In W Magazine, Powell notes that "[M]odeling is a new thing ... I've been basically shooting all the gay publications, which is really, really great." He models in addition to acting, and was featured in the final issue of Hello Mr.

Powell played Tony, the protagonist, in the 2020 Broadway revival of West Side Story.

In November 2020, Powell was cast in Universal Pictures and director Stephen Chbosky's film adaptation of Dear Evan Hansen as new character Rhys, a high school jock.

On August 29, 2021, Powell was featured in the Public Broadcasting Service (PBS) network's aired concert for the musical Wicked which was hosted by Kristin Chenoweth and Idina Menzel. Other featured artists were Rita Moreno, Cynthia Erivo, Ariana DeBose, Ali Stroker, Amber Riley, Mario Cantone, Jennifer Nettles, Stephanie Hsu, Alex Newell, Gavin Creel and Gabrielle Ruiz performing many of the musical's numbers.

Personal life
Powell is gay and came out at the age of 16. In 2016, Powell met Broadway actor, Wesley Taylor, when Taylor was visiting University of North Carolina School of the Arts where Powell was a junior in the school's theatre program. The two then began a relationship in 2017 and were engaged in May 2019. They ended their relationship in 2021.

Theatre credits

Filmography

Film

Television

Awards and nominations

References

External links
 
 
 Resume at University of North Carolina School of the Arts
 Powell sings excerpt from "Some Girls", Once on This Island (2017)

1994 births
21st-century American male actors
African-American male actors
African-American male models
American male musical theatre actors
American male film actors
American male television actors
American gay actors
Gay models
LGBT African Americans
LGBT people from North Carolina
Living people
Male actors from North Carolina
Male models from North Carolina
People from Greensboro, North Carolina
University of North Carolina School of the Arts alumni
21st-century African-American male singers